Patricia Ann Woertz, (born March 17, 1953), is a retired American businesswoman. She has formerly served as the President and CEO of Archer Daniels Midland. She was previously Executive Vice President of the Chevron Corporation, where she spent 29 years and served as its Executive Vice President of Global Downstream. As of 2014, she is listed as the 85th most powerful woman in the world by Forbes.

Education and early career
Born in Pittsburgh, Pennsylvania in 1953, she studied accounting at Penn State University, graduating in 1974.
She first worked for Ernst & Young in Pittsburgh, then moved to Gulf Oil, an Ernst & Young client. She was briefly in Vancouver, British Columbia, to become President of Chevron International and ultimately Executive Vice President of Chevron's global downstream operations. At ADM, she is expected to focus on ethanol and biofuels.

Archer Daniels Midland career
As CEO of Archer Daniels Midland, in 2010, she was ranked the 3rd most powerful woman by Fortune magazine. In 2009, with a rank of 93, Woertz was the top-ranking woman on the Fortune 500's list of top CEOs. Also in 2009, Forbes ranked Woertz as the 26th most powerful woman in the world. Formerly an Executive Vice President at Chevron Corporation, Woertz left to pursue CEO opportunities. In an interview with Fortune Magazine, she characterized herself as an outsider at ADM: "I'm outside the company, outside the industry, outside the family, outside the gender expectations."
While CEO of Archer Daniels Midland in 2009, Patricia A. Woertz earned a total compensation of $14,689,022, which included a base salary of $1,300,000, a cash bonus of $2,040,384, stocks granted of $4,919,563, options granted of $6,356,267, and other compensation totaling $72,807.

She is also a member of the Executive Committee of The Business Council for 2011 and 2012.

2014 has been ADM's best year in the history of the company. Thus as of 2014, Woertz is listed as the 85th most powerful woman in the world by Forbes. Woertz earned a total salary of $29,800,000 in 2014 including a cash bonus of $9,300,000 and stocks granted of $7,550,000.

On November 5, 2014, ADM announced that effective January 1, 2015, Juan Luciano will become the company's new CEO.

Personal life
Woertz currently resides in Chicago, IL.

References

External links
 The Outsider Fortune, October 2006
 Patricia Woertz and the New (Old) Thing RyanBlitstein.com June 4, 2009

1953 births
Living people
American women chief executives
20th-century American businesspeople
21st-century American businesspeople
American chairpersons of corporations
Smeal College of Business alumni
Businesspeople from Pittsburgh
Archer Daniels Midland people
American chief executives of Fortune 500 companies
20th-century American businesswomen
21st-century American businesswomen
Ernst & Young people